Live at Bohemian Caverns - Washington, DC is an album by pianist Les McCann recorded at the Bohemian Caverns nightclub and released on the Limelight label.

Reception

Allmusic gives the album 4 stars.

Track listing 
All compositions by Les McCann except as indicated
 "The Shout" - 5:30
 "Goin' Out of My Head" (Bobby Weinstein, Teddy Randazzo) - 2:45
 "Autumn Leaves" (Joseph Kosma, Jacques Prévert, Johnny Mercer) - 8:18
 "Nobody Else But Me" (Jerome Kern, Oscar Hammerstein II) - 5:50
 "Back Home Again in Indiana" (Ballard MacDonald, James F. Hanley) - 6:55
 "Colonel Rykken's Southern Fried Chicken" - 6:37

Personnel 
Les McCann - piano
Leroy Vinnegar - double bass
Frank Severino - drums
Technical
Reice Hamel - recording engineer

References 

Les McCann live albums
1967 live albums
Limelight Records live albums